Tyrone Gordon (born April 26, 1985 in Milwaukee, Wisconsin) is an American soccer forward.

Gordon attended Vincent High School in Milwaukee, Wisconsin.  In 2006, he played six games for the Minnesota Thunder of the USL First Division.

References

External links
 Milwaukee Wave

Living people
American soccer players
USL First Division players
Milwaukee Wave players
Minnesota Thunder players
1985 births
Association football forwards
Soccer players from Milwaukee